Bernt André Moen (born 17 February 1974) is a Norwegian musician. He is known as a jazz pianist, composer and music teacher.

Career 

Moen was born in Kristiansand. He has been involved in a series of metal bands, and is now associate professor in performing rhythmic piano at the University of Agder.

Within his own studio ("Studio 3014") and own label (BAM Records), he made his debut as solo artist in 2011, with three album releases, Closure featuring recordings from the period 2006–10, together with Fredrik Sahlander (bass) and Trygve Tambs-Lychè (drums), except the uptempo avalanche "FXG", where Geir Åge Johnsen takes care of the drums. The two solo albums are from a more recent date, recorded in January (Vol.1) and May (Vol.2). The repertoire on both is dominated by relatively short improvisations, often lyrical, quiet and with very deliberate use of pauses. But both also show a pianist with technique, including sound therapy, which enables him to exploit the instrument's sonic potential of slender tone migrations to deafening crescendi.

Honors 
2011: Spellemannprisen "This year's innovator" within Shining

Discography

Solo albums 
 2011: Solopiano Vol.1 (BAM Records)
 2011: Solopiano Vol.2 (BAM Records)
 2014: Solopiano Vol.3 (BAM Records)
 2019: Sunhill (BAM Records)
With Bernt Moen Trio including Fredrik Sahlander (bass) and Trygve Tambs-Lychè (drums)

 2011: Closure (BAM Records)
With Bernt Moen Trio including Fredrik Sahlander (bass) and Jan Inge Nilsen (drums)

 2021: The Storm (Losen Records Records)

With BWM Trio including Klaus Robert Blomvik (drum) and Roger Williamsen (bass)
 2012: Jazz! 'Øh (BAM Records), recorded in 2000
 2013: Whether It Is Necessary Remains To Be Seen (BAM Records)
 With Dualistic including Tobias Øymo Solbakk (drums) and Fredrik Sahlander (bass)
 2019: Dualistic (Losen Records)
 With Johnsen/Sahlander/Moen 
 2019: 1+1=3 (Losen Records)
 2020: Second Time`s the Charm (Losen Records)

Collaborations 
 With Green Carnation
 2001: Light of Day, Day of Darkness (Prophecy Productions)
 2003: A Blessing in Disguise (Season of Mist)
 2005: The Quiet Offspring (Season of Mist)
 2006: The Acoustic Verses (The End Records)
 With Erik Faber
 2002 Between The Lines (Sony Music Entertainment Norway)
 2004 Century (Sony Music Entertainment Norway)
 2006 Passages (Sony BMG Music Entertainment Norway)
 With Mike & The Blue Family
 2004 Family Business (BAM Records)
 2006 Business As Usual (BAM Records)
 With Ronnie Jacobsen Vs. Salvador
 2004 Adjust Your Stereo (MTG Productions)
 With Ronnie Jacobsen
 2005 Soulified (MTG Productions)
 With Rolf Kristensen
 2005 Shimmering Minor (Ponca Jazz Records)
 2018 Timelines (Losen Records)
 With Blood Red Throne
 2005: Altered Genesis (Earache)
 With Thulsa Doom
 2005 Keyboard, Oh Lord! Why Don't We? (Duplex Records)
 2017 A Keen Eye for the Obvious (Duplex Records)
 With Jørn Skogheim
 2007 Above Water (Curling Legs)
 2010 New Direction (Curling Legs)
 With Trail of Tears
 2007: Existentia (Napalm Records)
 With Magne Furuholmen
 2008 A Dot of Black in the Blue of Your Bliss (Passionfruit Records)
 With Lene Marlin
 2009: Twist the Truth (EMI)
 With Petter Carlsen
 2009: You Go Bird (EMI Music, Norway)
 2011: Clocks Don't Count (Friskt Pust Records)
 2018: Glimt Av Glimt, String Arrangements (Friskt Pust Records
 2020: The Sum of Every Shade, String Arrangements (Friskt Pust Records)
 With Nypan
 2010: Elements (Ponca Jazz Records)
 2017: Stereotomic (Losen Records)
 With Shining
 2010: Blackjazz (Indie Recordings)
 2011: Live Blackjazz (Indie Recordings)
 With Phone Joan
 2012: +4791799466 (Vorecords)
 With Per Kjetil Farstad
 2012: Swing Picking Guitar (No1 Music Group)
 With Tom Hugo
 2012: Sundry Tales (HW Records)
 With The Scheen
 2012: The Scheen (ArtistPartner Records)
 With Tristania
 2013: Darkest White (uncredited, Napalm Records)
 With Alice & the Mountain
 2013: Hunt You (2013 Karma Kosmetix Music)
 2015: Devil's Favorite (Massiveskills Version) (BAM Records)
 2019: Stranger Single (BAM Records)
 2019: Lonely Single (BAM Records)
 With Haddy
 2015: Nattblomst (GRAPPA)
 With SAH!
 2015: Past:Present (BAM Records)
 2015: Present:Future feat/Kirk Covington (BAM Records)
 2020: LIVE! (BAM Records)
 2021: Past Present Future (Losen Records)
 With Addiktio
 2018: Verraton (Raindrops Music)
 With Carina Frantzen
 2019: Blacklist (Mørketid)
 With Red Kite
 2019: Red Kite (RareNoiseRecords)
 2021: Apophenian Bliss (RareNoiseRecords)
 With Paper Crown
 2021: Dreamers (Paper Crown Music)
 With Various Artists
 2021: Lockdown Live (Ponca Jazz Records)

References

External links 

Jazzland Recordings (1997) artists
Academic staff of the University of Agder
Avant-garde jazz musicians
Norwegian black metal musicians
20th-century Norwegian pianists
21st-century Norwegian pianists
Norwegian jazz pianists
Norwegian jazz composers
Male jazz composers
Norwegian rock drummers
Male drummers
1974 births
Living people
Musicians from Kristiansand
20th-century drummers
21st-century Norwegian drummers
Norwegian male pianists
20th-century Norwegian male musicians
21st-century Norwegian male musicians
Shining (Norwegian band) members
Blood Red Throne members